Apriona neglecta is a species of beetle in the family Cerambycidae. It was described by Ritsema in 1911. It is known from Sulawesi and Sumatra.

References

Batocerini
Beetles described in 1911